WARZ-LD, virtual channel 21 (UHF digital channel 26), is a low-power 3ABN-affiliated television station licensed to Smithfield, North Carolina, United States. The station is owned by Tutt Media Group. WARZ-LD's studios and transmitter are located on South Pollock Street (US 301) in Selma, near the Selma Memorial Cemetery.

Subchannel

References

External links
 (under construction)

Low-power television stations in the United States
ARZ-LD
2013 establishments in North Carolina
Television channels and stations established in 2013
Smithfield, North Carolina